The Honda HSV-010 GT (an abbreviation for Honda Sports Velocity) is a grand touring race car manufactured and designed by Honda. The HSV-010 GT served as the successor to the first generation Honda NSX-GT and competed in the Japanese Super GT racing series, where it competed from 2010 to 2013.

Car development
On October 23, 2009, Honda officially announced the end of the mid-engine NSX-GT's participation in Super GT racing, as it was only allowed to participate as an exception in the 2009 season. In principle, Super GT's 2009 regulations allowed the use of only front-engine rear-drive cars, and Honda did not have a FR successor car ready due to the economic environment at the time.

On November 15, 2009, Honda announced that, despite withdrawing the NSX from Super GT competition, it would campaign a car for the 2010 season. Honda revealed that the car would be based on the cancelled "New NSX" production vehicle. Unlike typical Super GT cars, the vehicle is not based on any production vehicle that is made available to purchase by the general public. It is reported that although the Super GT normally requires racing vehicles to be based on production cars, the use of a production-ready car is also allowed. The  HR10EG V8 engine was based on the HR09E built for Formula Nippon. On December 22, 2009, Honda announced the HSV-010 GT as the successor to the NSX Super GT in the Super GT series.

Motorsport history 

The Honda HSV-010 GT officially debuted in the 2010 Super GT Series with five GT500 entries from Weider Honda Racing, Autobacs Racing Team Aguri, Keihin Real Racing, Nakajima Racing, and Team Kunimitsu. Weider Honda Racing won the teams' championship, with Takashi Kogure and Loïc Duval winning the drivers' championship.

For the 2011 season, the HSV-010 GT's radiator was divided in two and relocated to the sides of the car, with the goal of quicker cornering via a reduced moment of inertia with respect to yaw. However, in doing so, the centre of mass was raised, and configuration and adjustment became a more difficult and time-consuming task.

For the 2013 season, the last season under 2009 regulations, the radiator was moved back to the front of the car with lightened equipment. Instead, a shorter exhaust system with exhaust exits on both sides was used, allowing the V8 engine to rev higher. The HSV-010 GT's overall potential was improved, with the #17 Keihin HSV-010 placing second overall in the Teams' Championship.

The HSV-010 GT was superseded by the Honda NSX Concept-GT for 2014, based on the second generation NSX Concept.

References

External links

Honda Worldwide | HSV-010GT official site
Honda HSV-010 GT | 進化したHSV-010 GT 本格化する2011年モデルの熟成 in Japanese
Honda HSV-010 GT | GTプロジェクトリーダー 瀧敬之介 現場レポート in Japanese

Hsv-010 Gt
Grand tourer racing cars
Coupés
Cars introduced in 2009
Rear-wheel-drive vehicles